The Trofeo Paolo Corazzi was a professional tennis tournament played on outdoor hard courts. It was currently part of the ATP Challenger Tour. It was held annually at the Centro Sportivo Stradivari in Cremona, Italy, since 1997 (as a club event from 1997 to 2003, as a Futures from 2004 to 2007, as a Challenger since 2008).

Eduardo Schwank was the only player to win both singles and doubles titles in the same year.

Past finals

Singles

Doubles

External links
Official website
ITF search

 
ATP Challenger Tour
Hard court tennis tournaments
Tennis tournaments in Italy